Sakala Upland is hilly area of higher elevation in Southern Estonia. Upland's area is about 2792 km2.

The highest point of upland is Härjassaare Hill (147 m).

About 1/4 of upland is taken under protection. The biggest protection area is Loodi Landscape Conservation Area.

References

Hills of Estonia